Perityleae is a tribe of flowering plants in the subfamily Asteroideae. The species of its genera are native exclusively to the New World.

This tribe is closely related to the Eupatorieae tribe. It was classified as a separate tribe following molecular studies of plastid DNA sequences.

Subtribes and genera
Perityleae subtribes and genera recognized by the Global Compositae Database as of April 2022:

Subtribe Galeaninae 
Galeana 
Villanova 
Subtribe Lycapsinae 
Lycapsus 
Subtribe Peritylinae
Amauria 
Eutetras 
Pericome 
Perityle

References

 
Asteraceae tribes